The Sanborn River is a  river in Maine. It flows from its source on Round Mountain in the unorganized territory of South Oxford to Hicks Pond in the town of Greenwood. Hicks Pond drains via Niles Brook into the Little Androscoggin River, the Androscoggin River, and thence into Merrymeeting Bay in the Kennebec River estuary.

See also
List of rivers of Maine

References

Maine Streamflow Data from the USGS
Maine Watershed Data From Environmental Protection Agency

Tributaries of the Kennebec River
Rivers of Maine
Rivers of Oxford County, Maine